Sergei Ivanovich Zimin (June 20 (June 8, Old Style), 1875 – July 26, 1942) was anentrepreneur and opera manager from the Russian Empire. In 1903 he founded Zimin Opera company.

He was born in Zuevo, to an Old Believer family, the son of textile mill owner Ivan Nikitich Zimin.

Under his leadership Zimin Opera staged more than 120 operas.

1875 births
1942 deaths
Businesspeople from the Russian Empire